Libby Birch (born 3 December 1997) is an Australian rules footballer who plays for Melbourne in the AFL Women's (AFLW). She played the first 3 seasons of AFLW for the Western Bulldogs. She previously played netball and captained Victoria at the National Netball Championships. Birch is currently studying a Physiotherapy degree at La Trobe University. In 2016, Birch switched from netball to Australian rules football and was recruited by the Western Bulldogs as a rookie after having only played football for three months for the Darebin Falcons in the VFL Women's.

Sporting background 
In April 2016, Birch won a silver medal for netball when Victoria finished runners-up at the under 21 national championships. After the tournament, Daisy Pearce from the Darebin Falcons made contact with Birch and invited her to trial for the inaugural AFL Women's season. Prior to 18 June 2016, she had never kicked a football but only ten weeks later, Birch played and won a VFL Women's premiership with her team, Darebin. In 2015, she had also won the Victorian Netball League grand final (championship division) with Boroondarah Express.

AFL Women's career
In 2017, Birch played all seven games for the Western Bulldogs as a 19-year old rookie. She made her AFL Women's (AFLW) debut in the opening round against Fremantle and played as a half back and also on the wing but her overall athletic profile allows her the ability to play any position.  In the off-season of the AFLW, she continues to play for Darebin in the VFL Women's. In May 2017, she re-signed with the Western Bulldogs on to the senior list for the 2018 AFLW season.

Birch was one of two round 2 nominees for the 2018 AFL Women's Rising Star award after a strong defensive tagging role and six disposal match against Brisbane in February 2018.
She went on to run fifth in the bulldogs best and fairest count, play in their premiership win and make the All Australian Squad. Birch also won the competitions AFLW rebel young leader award for 2018.

After playing every game in AFLW season 3, Birch finished 5th again in the Bulldogs best and fairest. On the last day of the AFLW April 2019 sign and trade period Melbourne secured Birch for at least the next 2 seasons. The Western Bulldogs finally agreed to terms with Birch being traded for Ashleigh Guest plus picks 8 and 48.

In April 2019, Birch was traded to Melbourne, while Ashleigh Guest joined the Western Bulldogs.

In her first season for Melbourne in 2020, Libby won the clubs Trademark Award along with finishing 5th in the Best and Fairest. In addition to this, Libby was picked in the AFLW All Australian Team as well as the AFLPA 22Under22 All Australian Team. Libby was also a nominee for the AFLPA's MVP Award and Most Courageous.

Outside of her on-field playing ability, Libby also featured in a Special Comments role for SEN's AFLW Commentary as well as play a prominent role in NAB AFL Auskick at Home Content Series, motivating kids to stay active during the COVID-19 lockdown periods. Birch joined Melbourne's leadership group before the first bounce of the 2021 AFLW season.
In season 6 2022 birch was again nominated for the All Australian team and in season 7 Won the Afl Women's premiership for the second time being the first women to win a premiership at 2 different clubs .Birch continues to write for the Age and feature as a specialist for channel 7  In 2023 Birch will also cover AFL for 3AW as an expert commentator.

Sporting achievements 
 Victorian state hockey team and open state league team in 2011 and 2012 (Footscray Hockey Club)
 Captain Victorian state netball team — gold medallist in the National Championships from 2011 to 2014
 Australian netball underage squad member in 2012, 2013, 2014
 Victorian Institute of Sport full scholarship from 2013 to 2015
 Victorian Netball League grand final player — Premiership winners in the Championship division with the Boroondara Netball Club in 2015
 Most valuable player Victorian Netball League in 2016 (Boroondara Netball Club)
 Under 21 and Australian Netball League squad (Victoria) in 2016 and 2017
 Western Bulldogs AFLW player, inaugural 2017 season
 VFL Women's premiership player 2016 and 2017 Darebin Falcons
 Nab Rising Star Nominee 2018
 All Australian AFLW squad selection 2018
 rebel 2018 AFLW young leader award winner
 Western Bulldogs AFLW premiership player 2018
 Western Bulldogs VFLW 3rd place Best & Fairest 2018
 VFL Women's Team of the Year selection 2018 and 2019
 Casey Demons Runner Up Best & Fairest 2019
 2019 Inaugural Western Bulldogs Community Service Award.
 Melbourne AFLW Trademark Award 2020
 Melbourne AFLW 5th Place Best & Fairest 2020
 AFLPA MVP Nominee 2020
 AFLPA Most Courageous Nominee 2020
 AFLW All Australian Team - Centre Half Back 2020
 AFLW 22Under22 All Australian Team 2020

References

External links 

 
 

Living people
1997 births
Australian rules footballers from Melbourne
Western Bulldogs (AFLW) players
Darebin Falcons players
Melbourne Football Club (AFLW) players
Australian netball players
Sportswomen from Victoria (Australia)
Victorian Netball League players
Netball players from Melbourne